The Ministry of Public Security (Lao language: ກະຊວງປ້ອງກັນຄວາມສະຫງົບ) is the ministry of the interior of Laos.

Structure and organization
The Ministry of Public Security comprizes several "branches of service", which include the local police, traffic police, immigration police, security police (including border police), and other armed police units. The current minister is Lieutenant General Vilay Lakhamfong.

List of Ministers of Public Security
Gen. Vilay LAKHAMFONG
Lt. Gen. Kongthong PHONGVICHITH
Maj. Gen. Thonglek MANGNORMEX

International cooperation
In order to increase its capacity to address issues such as the illegal drugs trade and human trafficking, the Ministry of Public Security has established working relations with a number of foreign government agencies and international organisations, including UNODC and UNICEF.

Human rights issues
The security forces subjected to the ministry have occasionally been accused of human rights violations. Their persecution of Christians in Laos is among the heaviest in the world. Particularly, members of the Hmong ethnic group have been subject to violence by security forces.

Ranks
Officers

Enlisted

See also 
 Crime in Laos
 Directorate of National Coordination (DNC)
 Laotian Civil War
 Lao People's Armed Forces
 Royal Lao Police

References

External links 
Country data Laos – National Police and Paramilitary forces
 humansecuritygateway.info 
 List of current Lao government's ministers, including Public Security. 
 Persecution of Christians in Laos

Ministries of the Government of Laos
Law enforcement in Laos
National Central Bureaus of Interpol
Military of Laos
1976 establishments in Laos